Springfield is a small settlement in County Fermanagh, Northern Ireland, near Enniskillen and Lough Erne. In the 2001 Census it had a population of 69 people. It is situated in the Fermanagh and Omagh District Council area.

References 
NI Neighbourhood Information System

See also 

List of villages in Northern Ireland
List of towns in Northern Ireland

Villages in County Fermanagh